National Tertiary Route 915, or just Route 915 (or ) is a National Road Route of Costa Rica, located in the Guanacaste province.

Description
In Guanacaste province the route covers Nandayure canton (Bejuco district).

References

Highways in Costa Rica